The  – also anglicized as skene – is a small, single-edged knife worn as part of traditional Scottish Highland dress along with the kilt. Originally used for eating and preparing fruit, meat, and cutting bread and cheese, as well as serving for other more general day-to-day uses such as cutting material and protection, it is now worn as part of traditional Scottish dress tucked into the top of the kilt hose with only the upper portion of the hilt visible. The  is normally worn on the same side as the dominant hand.

Etymology and spelling
The name comes from the Scottish Gaelic . Compare also other Gaelic word-formations such as  "underwater skerry" (lit. black skerry),  "riddle" (lit. hidden word),  "enigma" (lit. hidden question).

Despite this practice, a small twin edged-dagger, (a mattucashlass), concealed under the armpit, combined with a smaller knife,, concealed in the hose or boot, would offer an element of defence or of surprise if employed in attack.

However, the term for the ceremonial knife is a set-phrase containing a fossilized historical form. In older Gaelic, a system of blocked lenition meant that lenition did not occur when the adjective started with a consonant of the same group as the final consonant of the noun, and n and d are both dental in Gaelic.

Various alternative spellings are found in English, including "skene-dhu" and "skean-dhu".

The Gaelic plural, is only rarely encountered in English. The anglicised plural is most commonly sgian-dubhs (in its various spellings), though sgians-dubh is also occasionally encountered.

Origins

Used by the Scots of the 17th and  18th centuries, this knife was slightly larger than the average modern  and was carried in the upper sleeve or lining of the body of the jacket.

Courtesy and etiquette would demand that when entering the home of a friend, any concealed weapons would be revealed. It follows that the  would be removed from its hiding place and displayed in the stocking top held securely by the garters.

The  also resembles the small skinning knife that is part of the typical set of hunting knives. These knives usually had antler handles, as do many early sgian-dubhs. The larger knife is likely the ancestor of the modern dirk.

Bog oak, jet black in appearance, was a very hard wood suitable for the purpose. The handles on the stag knives simulate horn which was also traditionally used. Any ornamentation is merely a reflection of the Highlander's lack of confidence in paper money which resulted in him embellishing much of his personal wearing apparel with silver and valuable cairngorm stones.  Thus he carried on his person most of his worldly wealth. The black dagger was usually carried in a place of concealment very often under his armpit (or oxter). When the Highlander visited a house on his travels having deposited all his other weapons at the front door he did not divest himself of his concealed dagger. Etiquette called for its removal from its place of concealment and displayed somewhere where his host could see it, usually in the stocking on the side of his dominant hand (right- or left-handed).

The  can be seen in portraits of kilted men of the mid-19th century. A portrait by Sir Henry Raeburn of Colonel Alasdair Ranaldson MacDonell of Glengarry hangs in the National Gallery of Scotland; it shows hanging from his belt on his right hand side a Highland Scottish dirk, and visible at the top of his right stocking what appears to be a nested set of two sgian-dubhs. A similar sgian-dubh is in the collection of The National Museum of Antiquities of Scotland.

Construction

The early blades varied in construction, some having a "clipped" (famously found on the Bowie knife) or "drop" point. The "spear-point" tip has now become universal. The earliest known blades, some housed in the National Museum of Scotland in Edinburgh, are made from German or Scandinavian steel, which was highly prized by the Highlanders. Scalloped filework on the back of the blade is common on all Scottish knives.

Traditionally the scabbard is made of leather reinforced with wood and fitted with mounts of silver or some other metal which may be cast or engraved with designs ranging from Scottish thistles, Celtic knotwork, or heraldic elements such as a crest. The sheaths of many modern sgian-dubhs are made of plastic mounted with less expensive metal fittings.

Since the modern  is worn mainly as a ceremonial item of dress and is usually not employed for cutting food or self-defence, blades are often of a simple (but not unglamorous) construction. These are typically made from stainless steel. The hilts used on many modern sgian-dubhs are made of plastic that has been molded to resemble carved wood and fitted with cast metal mounts and synthetic decorative stones. Some are not even knives at all, but a plastic handle and sheath cast as one piece. Other examples are luxurious and expensive art pieces, with hand-carved ebony or bog wood hilts, sterling silver fittings and may have pommels set with genuine cairngorm stones and blades of Damascus steel or etched with Celtic designs or heraldic motifs.

Legality

For example, they were banned from a school dance in Scotland,
and initially banned for the June 2014 celebration of the Battle of Bannockburn.

Air travellers are now globally required by airport security to put  in their checked baggage.

A Montreal bagpiper who got a ticket from police for wearing the knife fought the charge at court. Police gave Jeff McCarthy a $221 ticket for sporting it in his kilt hose while performing at the McGill University convocation ceremony on 2 November 2016.  The case was dropped in May 2018 and his knife was returned.

See also
Mattucashlass
Kirpan

References

External links

 The Sgian-dubh (Joe D. Huddleston)
 The Skean Dhu (Scotland for Visitors)

Blade weapons
Ceremonial knives
Daggers
Scottish clothing
Scottish Gaelic language
Weapons of Scotland